Amara is a town in Ialomița County, Muntenia, Romania. It is located in Bărăgan on the shores of Lake Amara, at 7 km kilometers north of the county capital, Slobozia. Amara was elevated to town status in 2004.

Demographics
At the census from 2011, Amara, Romania have a total of 7080 residents, 3507 males, and 3573 females.

References

Amara
Amara
Localities in Muntenia
Spa towns in Romania